Alpine Bobsled is a steel bobsled roller coaster located at the Six Flags Great Escape and Hurricane Harbor amusement park in Queensbury, New York. Manufactured by Intamin, the coaster first opened to the public in 1984 at Six Flags Great Adventure. It was relocated to Six Flags Great America in 1989, and then to Six Flags Great Escape in 1998.

Theming
The alpine theme of the coaster was partly inspired by the park's proximity to Lake Placid New York where the 1980 and 1932 Winter Olympics, both of which included bobsled races, were held. The ride has six cars, all themed from different countries: the United Kingdom, United States, Italy, Jamaica, Canada and Switzerland. The ride regularly runs three sleds with the fourth being stored on the transfer track next to the load station. The four sleds are regularly rotated in and out over the course of the year, with the ride occasionally running all four at the same time. The two sleds not being used during a season are rehabbed and rotated out on a yearly basis.  A large archway is the entrance to the long queue area leading up to the loading station. The arch itself is decorated with an old Olympic-style bobsled and the path up to the loading area is scattered with old broken sleds as well. The loading station is built to resemble a 19th-century alpine ski lodge. The outside of the bobsled's trough is purple and white, with the inside also being white.

History
The coaster was built in 1984 and was located at Six Flags Great Adventure as the Sarajevo Bobsled. The ride was quite popular. Its purpose was to commemorate the 1984 Olympics. The area of the park was becoming dull and needed an overhaul.

In the spring of 1988, it was determined that this area would have an Airplane/Space/Boardwalk theme, and that the park needed a larger roller coaster, and that the coaster would occupy the land that Sarajevo Bobsleds was occupying. The Bobsled was then closed mid season and dismantled. The coaster was replaced with a multiple steel looping roller coaster that was then state of the art and would for a month be the tallest coaster in the world. Great American Scream Machine was built in its place and it stood there until it was dismantled in July of the 2010 season to make room for a new stand-up roller coaster named Green Lantern.

After the ride was dismantled and removed, it was relocated to Six Flags Great America in 1989 and opened as Rolling Thunder. It was replaced by Raging Bull, a state of the art steel hyper twister non-looping coaster. Rolling Thunder was then sold to Premier Parks and then moved to Great Escape in 1997.

It reopened in 1998 as the Alpine Bobsled. Premier Parks bought Six Flags in 1998 bringing Great Escape into and this coaster back to the Six Flags family. During its run at Great Escape, due to noise complaints, the ride closes the line at 6 PM every operating day.

Trains
Riders are arranged two across in four rows per car with the cars made by Giovanola. As of 2015, there are 4 cars in use and 2 in storage and the back rows are closed off due to whiplash.

References

External links
 

Roller coasters in New York (state)
Bobsled roller coasters
Roller coasters manufactured by Intamin
Roller coasters introduced in 1998
Roller coasters introduced in 1989
Roller coasters introduced in 1984
The Great Escape and Hurricane Harbor
Six Flags Great America
Six Flags Great Adventure
Roller coasters operated by Six Flags
Steel roller coasters
Former roller coasters in New Jersey